Fousseni Diawara (born 28 August 1980) is a professional football manager and former player who played as a right-back. Born in France, he represented the Mali national team.

Club career
Starting his career in Parisien club Red Star 93, Diawara moved to AS Saint-Étienne in 2000 and made his debut against Rennes in September.

In January 2008, Diawara signed a 2.5-year deal with Panionios F.C.

On 10 September 2009, he signed a one-year deal with FC Istres. He signed for AC Ajaccio on 16 June 2010.

International career
Diawara played international matches for the Mali national team.

Managerial career
Diawara began his career as Mali national team coordinator at the end of his professional career after 2014–15 season.

Personal life
He is the brother of footballers Samba and Abdoulaye.

Honours
Mali
Africa Cup of Nations bronze: 2013

References

External links
 Club profile  
 
 

1980 births
Living people
Footballers from Paris
Association football defenders
Citizens of Mali through descent
Malian footballers
Mali international footballers
Malian football managers
French footballers
French football managers
French sportspeople of Malian descent
Red Star F.C. players
AS Saint-Étienne players
Stade Lavallois players
FC Sochaux-Montbéliard players
Panionios F.C. players
FC Istres players
AC Ajaccio players
Tours FC players
Ligue 1 players
Ligue 2 players
Super League Greece players
Malian expatriate footballers
Malian expatriate sportspeople in Greece
Expatriate footballers in Greece
2002 African Cup of Nations players
2004 African Cup of Nations players
2013 Africa Cup of Nations players
2015 Africa Cup of Nations players